Donald Benamna (born 14 September 1996) is a Central African Republic footballer who currently plays for Northern Colorado Hailstorm in the USL League One.

Personal
Born in Bangui, Central African Republic. He moved to the United States when he was twelve years old.

Career

College & Amateur
Benamna began playing college soccer at San Diego State University in 2014, before making transfers to San Jacinto College in 2015, and later to the University of Central Arkansas in 2017. Benamna spent part of 2016 with USL PDL side Ocean City Nor'easters.

Benamna spent both 2018 and 2019 playing with NPSL side Little Rock Rangers.

Professional
In September 2019, Benamna signed for NISA side Stumptown Athletic ahead of the league's inaugural season. 

In 2022, Benamna had spells with USL League Two side Charlotte Eagles and NISA side Maryland Bobcats FC.

On 23 February 2023, Benamna signed with USL League One side Northern Colorado Hailstorm after a successful trial.

International career
In October 2019, Benamna was called up for the first time for the Central African Republic for a friendly match against Niger.

References

External links
 Profile at San Diego State Athletics
 Profile at Central Arkansas Athletics
 Stumptown Athletic profile

1996 births
Living people
Central African Republic footballers
Central African Republic international footballers
Central African Republic emigrants
Association football forwards
San Diego State Aztecs men's soccer players
Ocean City Nor'easters players
Stumptown AC players
Charlotte Eagles players
Northern Colorado Hailstorm FC players
People from Bangui
Soccer players from Maryland
USL League Two players
National Premier Soccer League players
National Independent Soccer Association players
Central Arkansas Bears soccer players